Mitterstieler is a surname. Notable people with the surname include:

Helene Mitterstieler, Italian luger
P. Mitterstieler, Italian luger